Ujeździec  is a village in the administrative district of Gmina Paczków, within Nysa County, Opole Voivodeship, in south-western Poland, close to the Czech border.

The village has an approximate population of 443 and an area of 8.890km^2.

References

Villages in Nysa County